The Thomas Burnham House is a historic house located at 195 Ridge Street in Glens Falls, Warren County, New York.

Description and history 
It was built in 1897 by esteemed local architect Ephraim B. Potter, and is a massive, -story, square residential building with Queen Anne and Colonial Revival style design elements. It features a large tripartite gambrel-roofed dormer.

It was added to the National Register of Historic Places on September 29, 1984.

See also
 National Register of Historic Places listings in Warren County, New York

References

Houses on the National Register of Historic Places in New York (state)
Queen Anne architecture in New York (state)
Colonial Revival architecture in New York (state)
Houses completed in 1897
Houses in Warren County, New York
Glens Falls, New York
National Register of Historic Places in Warren County, New York